Prince Heinrich Wilhelm Adalbert of Prussia (29 October 1811 – 6 June 1873) was a son of Prince Wilhelm of Prussia and Landgravine Marie Anna of Hesse-Homburg. He was a naval theorist and admiral. He was instrumental during the Revolutions of 1848 in founding the first unified German fleet, the Reichsflotte. During the 1850s he helped to establish the Prussian Navy.

Biography
Adalbert was born in Berlin, the son of Prince William, the youngest brother of King Frederick William III.

As a young man, Adalbert entered the Prussian army and served in the artillery. Several journeys led him between 1826 and 1842 to the Netherlands, Britain, Russia, Turkey, Greece and Brazil. He recognized during his many sea voyages the importance that sea power had for a modern commercial and industrial nation. He studied carefully the theory of naval warfare and in 1835-36 wrote a first plan for the construction of a Prussian fleet. Prussia at that time was a land power focused on Continental Europe, possessing practically no navy of its own; rather, it relied on the allied powers of Britain, the Netherlands, and Denmark. During the First Schleswig War of 1848-51, however, the failure of this strategy became apparent: Britain and the Netherlands remained neutral and Denmark became the enemy. Within a few days the Danish navy had destroyed German maritime commerce in the North Sea and the Baltic.

During the Revolutions of 1848, the German National Assembly which met at St. Paul's Church in Frankfurt resolved with "a majority clearly bordering on unanimity" to establish a German Imperial fleet and named Prince Adalbert to lead the Maritime Technical Commission. He presented his recommendations in a "Memorandum on the Construction of a German Fleet" (Denkschrift über die Bildung einer deutschen Flotte) (Potsdam, 1848). In this memorandum, still regarded highly for its insights on naval strategy, Adalbert distinguished between three fleet models:
A naval force intended solely for defensive actions in relation to coastal defense;
An offensive naval force intended for national defense, and for the most necessary protection of commerce; or
An independent naval power.

Adalbert favored the middle solution, because it would not provoke the great sea powers (such as Britain), but would provide the German navy with significant value as an ally.

In 1849 his cousin, King Frederick William IV, ordered Adalbert to resign his office in the fledgling Imperial Navy. The reactionary king mistrusted the National Assembly because of its revolutionary nature, and had already turned down its offer to assume the German Imperial crown. Despite the setback, Adalbert continued to give active support to the construction of a fleet.

In 1852 Adalbert argued that Prussia needed to build a naval base on the North Sea. He arranged the Jade Treaty of 20 July 1853, in which Prussia and the Grand Duchy of Oldenburg jointly withdrew from a region on the west bank of the Jade bay, where from 1854 onward Prussia established the fortress, naval base and city of Wilhelmshaven.

On 30 March 1854, Adalbert was named Admiral of the Prussian Coast and Commander-in-Chief of the Navy. In the summer of 1856, while on a training cruise of Prussian warships, he was shot at by local Riffians within sight of Morocco's Rif coast and was wounded. During the Second Schleswig War of 1864 (also known as the "Danish-Prussian War") he commanded the Baltic Squadron, without being able to take an active role in the war.

After the Franco-Prussian War of 1870-1871, which led to the creation of the German Empire, Adalbert laid down his title of "Prince-Admiral" and retired from the now-renamed Imperial Navy.  He died two years later of liver disease, aged 62, in Karlsbad.

Adalbert was married to the dancer Therese Elssler (Frau von Barnim); their only son, Adalbert v. Barnim (born 22 April 1841), died in July 1860 during an expedition on the Nile.

Honours
He received the following orders and decorations:

Ancestry

References

1811 births
1873 deaths
People from the Province of Brandenburg
House of Hohenzollern
Prussian princes
People of the Revolutions of 1848
German military personnel of the Franco-Prussian War
Imperial German Navy admirals
Prussian naval officers
Writers from Berlin
German military writers
Military theorists
German male non-fiction writers
Recipients of the Pour le Mérite (military class)
Recipients of the Iron Cross, 1st class
Grand Crosses of the Military Merit Order (Bavaria)
Grand Crosses of the Order of Saint Stephen of Hungary
Recipients of the Military Merit Cross (Mecklenburg-Schwerin), 1st class
Recipients of the Order of the Netherlands Lion
Recipients of the Order of St. George of the Fourth Degree
Burials at Berlin Cathedral